In enzymology, a tabersonine 16-hydroxylase is an enzyme that catalyzes the chemical reaction

tabersonine + NADPH + H+ + O2  16-hydroxytabersonine + NADP+ + H2O

The 4 substrates of this enzyme are tabersonine, NADPH, H+, and O2, whereas its 3 products are 16-hydroxytabersonine, NADP+, and H2O.

This enzyme belongs to the family of oxidoreductases, specifically those acting on paired donors, with O2 as oxidant and incorporation or reduction of oxygen. The oxygen incorporated need not be derived from O2 with NADH or NADPH as one donor, and incorporation of one atom o oxygen into the other donor.  The systematic name of this enzyme class is tabersonine,NADPH:oxygen oxidoreductase (16-hydroxylating). Other names in common use include tabersonine-11-hydroxylase, and T11H.  This enzyme participates in terpene indole and ipecac alkaloid biosynthesis.

References

 

EC 1.14.13
NADPH-dependent enzymes
Enzymes of unknown structure